Lamia Ziadé (born in Beirut, Lebanon, 1968) is a Lebanese illustrator and visual artist. She grew up in Lebanon then moved to Paris and studied graphic arts at the Atelier Met de Penninghen. She lives and works in Paris.

Life and work
Lamia Ziadé began her career as a fabric designer for luxury brands, including Jean-Paul Gaultier and Issey Miyake.  She developed her illustration practice through the publication of books, including children’s books and adult books with sometimes erotic content.

In parallel to her drawings and illustrations, Ziadé began, in 2003, to work on larger scale artworks on erotic and humorous themes, with an esthetic inspired by Pop Art. These mixed media canvases imply a multiplicity of techniques (such as collage and embroidery) and the accumulation of heterogeneous artifacts such as minibar whisky bottles and Air France headrests. In 2008, she exhibited a project entitled Hotel’s War. This installation of wool and fabric childlike models of buildings makes reference to the Battle of the Hotels that took place in the heart of Beirut city in 1975–1976 years.

Trauma and memories from these events, and from the Lebanese Civil War in general pushed Lamia Ziadé to publish Bye Bye Babylon, an autobiographical illustrated novel in which she evokes her personal perception of the transformations that shook her country.

Publications
Strip tease (Rouergue, 1998)
Souliax (with Olivier Douzou, Rouergue, 1999)
Utilisation maximum de la douceur (with Vincent Ravalec; Seuil, 2001
Dix doigts pour une voix (with Patricia Huet; Seuil, 2002)
Bye Bye Babylon. Beirut 1975–1979 (Jonathan Cape, 2011)
Ô nuit, ô mes yeux: Le Caire / Beyrouth / Damas / Jérusalem (P.O.L., 2015)
Lettres à mon fils, with Fouad Elkoury (Actes Sud, 2016)
Ma très grande mélancolie arabe (P.O.L., 2017)

Selected exhibitions

Solo exhibitions
Lola Cartable, Galerie de l’Entretemps, Paris, 1996
Je veux que personne ne le sache, Galerie KamelMennour, Paris, 2003
I’m so glad you found me, Galerie Kamel  Mennour, Paris, 2006
Hotels' War, Galerie Tanit, Munich, 2008
Time for a Kent, Galerie Benjamin Trigano, Los Angeles, 2008
Chamade Paris, Galerie Alfa, Paris, 2009
Smoke, Espace Kettaneh Kunigk, Beirut, 2009

Group exhibitions
Girls, girls, girls, CAN, Neuchâtel, 2004
Sexy Souks, Point Ephémère, Paris, 2007
Phase Zéro, Galerie Serge Aboukrat, Paris, 2009
Blitz, Galerie ALFA, Paris,  2010
Tracés de voyages, If Galerie, Paris, 2010
All About Beirut, White Box, Munich, 2010
Rebirth, Lebanon 21st Century Contemporary Art, Beirut Exhibition Art Center, Beirut, 2011
Subtitled: With Narratives from Lebanon, Royal College of Art, London, 2011

References

External links

Lebanese women artists
Artists from Beirut
Lebanese women illustrators
Lebanese contemporary artists
French artists
1968 births
Living people